Yeljan Shinar (born 6 June 1999) is a Chinese footballer of Kazakh ethnicity currently playing as a defender for Chinese Super League club Shenzhen F.C.

Club career
Yeljan Shinar would be promoted to the senior team of Shenzhen in the 2019 Chinese Super League campaign and would make his debut in league game on 7 July 2019 against Hebei China Fortune F.C. in a 1-1 draw. On 18 July 2020 he would be loaned out to second tier football club Beijing BSU for the 2020 China League One campaign. He would make his debut for Beijing BSU in a league game on 13 September 2020 against Nei Mongol Zhongyou in a 1-0 victory.

International career
On 27 July 2022, Yeljan made his international debut in a 1-0 win against Hong Kong in the 2022 EAFF E-1 Football Championship, as the Chinese FA decided to field the U-23 national team for this senior competition.

Career statistics
 

Notes

References

External links

1999 births
Living people
Chinese people of Kazakhstani descent
Chinese footballers
Association football defenders
Shenzhen F.C. players
Beijing Sport University F.C. players
China League One players
Chinese Super League players
Footballers from Shanghai